Albert Belmont Graham (1868–1960) was born near Lena, Ohio. He was a country schoolmaster and agriculture extension pioneer at Ohio State University. Graham taught at an integrated rural school in Brown Township, Miami 
 County.

Later, Graham worked at the United States Department of Agriculture as the Federal Extension Director. On January 15, 1902, Graham held the first meeting of the agriculture experiment club in the basement of the A. B. Graham building in Springfield, Ohio (now called the A. B. Graham building). Through his diligent efforts, A. B. Graham is considered the impetus for founding the 4-H program across the United States.

His Columbus, Ohio house, the A.B. Graham House, was listed on the National Register of Historic Places in 2015.

References

External links 
 Biographical information

1868 births
1960 deaths
Ohio State University faculty
People from Springfield, Ohio